Pedro Miró Pérez (March 13, 1923 – January 28, 1996) was a Cuban second baseman in the Negro leagues in the 1940s.

A native of Alquizar, Cuba, Miró made his Negro leagues debut in 1945 with the New York Cubans, and played with New York again in 1948. He went on to play minor league baseball with the Geneva Robins in 1951. Miró died in Buffalo, New York in 1996 at age 72.

References

External links
 and Seamheads

1938 births
1996 deaths
New York Cubans players
Cuban baseball players
Baseball second basemen
People from Artemisa Province
Cuban expatriates in the United States
Geneva Robins players
Burials in Buffalo, New York